The Connecticut State Militia are the Armed Forces of the State of Connecticut under the authority of the Governor and the Adjutant General of the state.

Classes of Militia 
The Connecticut State Militia is divided into two classes: the National Guard and the naval militia.

 The organized militia consists of the Connecticut State Guard (the four units of the Governor's Guards are active), the Connecticut State Guard Reserve, and the Naval Militia.

 The Connecticut National Guard comprises both the Army and Air National Guard.

Private militias 
In Connecticut, it is illegal to train or act as a militia without express authority of the Governor or federal law.

Citations

Sources 

 
 

Military in Connecticut
Connecticut militia